The 1893 Drake Bulldogs football team was an American football team that represented Drake University as an independent during the 1893 college football season. In the school's inaugural season of intercollegiate football, there was no coach, and the team compiled a 0–2–1 record.

Schedule

References

Drake
Drake Bulldogs football seasons
College football winless seasons
Drake Bulldogs football